Daniel Tam Chi-kin (also Tam Chi-kin, ; born July 28, 1980) is a Hong Kong former swimmer, who specialized in breaststroke events. He is a two-time Olympian (2000 and 2004), and a double finalist in the 100 and 200 m breaststroke at the 2002 Asian Games in Busan, South Korea. Tam is a member of the swimming team for SLA Sports Club, and is trained by an Australian-born coach Anthony Giorgi.

Tam made his first Hong Kong squad at the 2000 Summer Olympics in Sydney, where he competed in the 200 m breaststroke. Swimming in heat three, he edged out Costa Rica's Juan José Madrigal to take a seventh spot and forty-second overall by 0.45 of a second in 2:24.04.

At the 2004 Summer Olympics in Athens, Tam extended his program, competing both in the 100 and 200 breaststroke as Hong Kong's only male swimmer. He posted FINA B-standard entry times of 1:04.35 (100 m breaststroke) and 2:18.10 (200 m breaststroke) from the Olympic trials in Auckland. On the first day of the Games, Tam raced to a strong time of 1:05.11 to lead the second heat of the 100 m breaststroke, but came up short with a forty-fourth-place effort from the morning preliminaries. In his second event, 200 m breaststroke, Tam challenged seven other swimmers in heat two, including dual citizen Mihail Alexandrov of Bulgaria. He rounded out the field to last place by 0.23 of a second behind New Zealand's Ben Labowitch in 2:19.48. Tam failed to advance into the semifinals, as he placed forty-second overall in the preliminaries.

References

External links
 HK Swim Bio 

1980 births
Living people
Hong Kong male breaststroke swimmers
Olympic swimmers of Hong Kong
Swimmers at the 2000 Summer Olympics
Swimmers at the 2004 Summer Olympics
Swimmers at the 2002 Asian Games
Swimmers at the 1998 Asian Games
Asian Games competitors for Hong Kong